Electric GT may refer to:
 The FIA Electric GT Championship, a planned championship for electric sports car racing organized by the Fédération Internationale de l'Automobile
 The Electric Production Car Series, a proposed championship for electric car racing organized by Electric GT Holdings